PIDS may refer to:

BBC Programme Identifiers
Passenger Information Display System
Perimeter intrusion detection system
Philippine Institute for Development Studies
Protocol-based intrusion detection system